Borna Ćorić was the defending champion but chose not to participate.

Diego Schwartzman won the title after defeating Rogério Dutra Silva 6–4, 6–1 in the final.

Seeds

Draw

Finals

Top half

Bottom half

References
Main Draw
Qualifying Draw

Claro Open Barranquilla - Singles